Grzeska may refer to:
Grześka, Łódź Voivodeship, Poland
Grzęska, Subcarpathian Voivodeship, Poland